Aristonicus may refer to:

 Aristonicus of Pergamon, who as king became Eumenes III (died 129 BC), and promised freedom to the slaves
 Aristonicus of Alexandria, grammarian and Homeric scholar
 Aristonicus of Carystus, ball-player in Alexander's entourage granted Athenian citizenship
 Aristonicus of Methymnae, 4th-century Lesbian tyrant
 Aristonicus (eunuch), who was brought up with Ptolemy Epiphanes
 Aristonicus of Tarentum, author of a work on mythology

it:Aristonico